The 1906 Open Championship was the 46th Open Championship, held 13–15 June at Muirfield in Gullane, East Lothian, Scotland. Defending champion James Braid won the Championship for the third time, four strokes ahead of runner-up J.H. Taylor.

There was no qualifying competition. All entries played 18 holes in pairs on the first two days with all those within 14 strokes of the leader making the cut and playing 36 holes on the final day.

The feature of the opening round on Wednesday was the play of the amateurs. John Graham Jr. led with a 71, while Robert Maxwell was amongst those tied for second on 73 with Robert Whitecross and Hugh Watt, both from Dirleton Castle Golf Club, a further shot behind.

Taylor and Harry Vardon came to fore in the second round on Thursday. Taylor was out in 41 but came back in 31, despite three-putting the last. Vardon was only a shot worse with a 73. Taylor led on 149, with Vardon and Graham on 150; 72 players were within 14 shots of Taylor and made the cut.

Taylor's third round 75 on Friday morning was good enough for him to retain the lead by a stroke over Rowland Jones and three over Braid and Vardon. In the final round that afternoon, Jones scored a disappointing 83 to drop out of contention, while Taylor scored 80 and Vardon 78. Only two players bettered 77, Walter Toogood with a 71 and Braid with a 73, but Toogood was already out of the picture after an 83 in the morning. Needing a 76 for victory, Braid reached the turn in 38 and after more steady play he was left with two fives at the last two holes to win. A  putt for a three at the 17th hole secured the victory.

Past champions in the field 

Source:

Did not enter: Jack White (1904), 
Harold Hilton (1892, 1897).

Round summaries

First round
Wednesday, 13 June 1906

Source:

Second round
Thursday, 14 June 1906

Source:

Third round
Friday, 15 June 1906 (morning)

Source:

Final round
Friday, 15 June 1906 (afternoon)

Source:

References

External links
Muirfield 1906 (Official site)

The Open Championship
Golf tournaments in Scotland
Open Championship
Open Championship
Open Championship